Cinderella lampra is a species of fly in the family Heleomyzidae.

References

Heleomyzidae
Taxa named by George C. Steyskal
Insects described in 1949